Colin McInnes may refer to:
Colin R. McInnes (born 1968), British engineer
Colin J. McInnes, expert in the relationship between health and foreign and security policy

See also
Colin MacInnes (1914–1976), English novelist